The MICCAI Society is a professional organization for scientists in the areas of Medical Image Computing and Computer Assisted Interventions. Due to the multidisciplinary nature of these fields, the society brings together researchers from several scientific disciplines. including computer science, robotics, physics, and medicine. The society is best known for its annual flagship event, The MICCAI Conference, which facilitates the publication and presentation of original research on MICCAI-related topics. However, the society provides endorsements and sponsorships for several scientific events each year.

History 

In 1998, three international conferences: Visualization in Biomedical Computing (VBC), Computer Vision and Virtual Reality in Robotics and Medicine (CVRMed), and Medical Robotics and Computer Assisted Surgery (MRCAS) merged into a single conference entitled "The International Conference on Medical Image Computing and Computer Assisted Interventions" (abbreviated MICCAI) with its first edition in Boston. The MICCAI Society was founded in 2004 by several active members of this research community and former chairs of the MICCAI conference. In 2009, the society introduced the "MICCAI Fellow" award to recognize senior members who had made substantial contributions to the MICCAI community. 12 fellows were elected in 2009 and three additional fellows are elected each year. New MICCAI Fellows are announced each year at the Annual MICCAI Conference. Since 2012, the society is involved in several events each year outside of the annual conference through endorsements and/or sponsorships. These include a number of smaller international conferences, MICCAI-focused workshop sessions at related conferences, and educational programs such as "summer schools".

Research focus

Medical Image Computing 

Medical Image Computing (the "MIC" in MICCAI) is the field of study involving the application of image processing and computer vision to medical imaging. The goals of medical image computing tasks are diverse, but some common examples are computer-aided diagnosis, image segmentation of anatomical structures and/or abnormalities, and the registration or "alignment" of medical images acquired through different means or at different points in time.

Computer Assisted Interventions 

Computer Assisted Interventions (the "CAI" in MICCAI) is the field of study concerned with the use of computational tools in medical interventions. Prominent examples of computer aided interventions currently in widespread use include image guided biopsy and robot-assisted surgery. Integral to this research area is effective human-computer interaction and user interface design.

Subgroups 

Within the MICCAI community, a number of organizations have emerged to represent and advocate for certain populations of MICCAI researchers. Among these are the MICCAI Student Board and the Women in MICCAI Committee.

MICCAI Student Board 

The MICCAI Student Board began in 2010 when MICCAI initiated its social media presence by creating a facebook group. This effort was championed by student researchers who used the group to organize events specifically for students at the 2011 and 2012 annual conferences. After the 2012 event, the MICCAI board of directors formally recognized the MICCAI student board as a part of the society and began providing support for the student board's annual events.

Women in MICCAI Committee 

The Women in MICCAI Committee began as a series of networking sessions for female researchers within the medical image analysis research community during the 2015 MICCAI conference and the 2016 IEEE International Symposium on Biomedical Imaging. In October 2016, the MICCAI board of directors approved a measure to create the "Women in MICCAI Committee" with the goal of strengthening the representation of female scientists in this research area.

Since its inception, the Women in MICCAI Committee has continued to organize networking sessions in conjunction with MICCAI events. It also developed and maintains several online platforms for discussion on social media. The committee is the primary interface between the MICCAI board of directors and the community of women researchers in MICCAI.

Annual MICCAI conference

Conference format 

MICCAI conferences are typically scheduled for five days, of which the first and last days set aside for satellite events consisting of tutorials, workshops, and challenges. Those include  the Brain lesion workshop (BrainLes),  the Workshop on Interpretability of Machine Intelligence in Medical Image Computing (iMIMIC), the Workshop on Domain Adaptation and Representation Transfer (DART), the International Workshop on Multimodal Brain Image Analysis (MBIA), and others. The main conference includes invited presentations, panel discussions, and podium and poster presentations of original research papers which are published by Springer Nature as conference proceedings.

Past MICCAI conferences

Upcoming MICCAI conferences

Publications 

The MICCAI conference proceedings consist of full-length papers which undergo comprehensive peer review. Since even before the merger of the CVRMed, MRCAS, and VBC conferences (see History), the proceedings of the annual conference have been published by Springer Nature as part of the Lecture Notes in Computer Science (LNCS) series.

In addition to the proceedings of the annual conference, MICCAI officially partners with two peer reviewed scientific journals: "Medical Image Analysis" published by Elsevier and "The International Journal of Computer Assisted Radiology and Surgery" (IJCARS) published by Springer Nature. These journals loosely correspond to the "MIC" and "CAI" focuses of the MICCAI Society respectively, but they have substantial overlap in subject matter.

The MICCAI Society also partners with Elsevier to develop a series of books on MICCAI-related research, written by scientists in the MICCAI research community. , nine books have been published in this series

See also 
 Robot-assisted surgery
 Computer vision
 Conference on Computer Vision and Pattern Recognition
 International Conference on Computer Vision
 European Conference on Computer Vision
 Institute of Electrical and Electronics Engineers
 International Society for Computer Aided Surgery

References

External links 
 The MICCAI Society Website

Computer science-related professional associations
Computer science organizations
Medical technology
Health informatics